Each year, the Western Hockey League awards a trophy to the Most Valuable Player in the Playoffs.

Winners

See also
Stafford Smythe Memorial Trophy - Memorial Cup MVP
Wayne Gretzky 99 Award - Ontario Hockey League Playoff MVP
Guy Lafleur Trophy - Quebec Major Junior Hockey League Playoff MVP

References

Western Hockey League trophies and awards